Guardian of the Wilderness is a 1976 theatrical narrative film (often alternatively titled Mountain Man) directed by David O'Malley about the true story of Galen Clark, an explorer who successfully campaigned to have the Yosemite area set aside from commercial development, the original forerunner of the American national parks system. Clark was prompted by his dedication to preserving places like the Mariposa Grove of Giant Sequoias, which he discovered, from being destroyed by loggers. The cast features Denver Pyle as Galen Clark, John Dehner as legendary naturalist John Muir and Ford Rainey as Abraham Lincoln. Clark was eventually appointed Superintendent of Yosemite, a position in which he served for more than two decades during which he defined the concept of an American park ranger; his varied history with the valley ranged across 55 years. 

A book written by Mark S. Rinehart in 2009 titled Abraham Lincoln on Screen: Fiction and Documentary Portrayals on Film and Television and published by McFarland & Company states that the sequence of the film involving Abraham Lincoln never took place nor did Clark ever travel to Washington D.C.

The film's supporting cast includes Ken Berry, Cheryl Miller, Norman Fell and Cliff Osmond. The screenplay was written by David O'Malley and Karen C. O'Malley from a story by the film's producer Charles E. Sellier Jr. loosely based on the actual events. The music was composed and conducted by John Cameron and the song "Yosemite Theme" features music by Bob Summers and lyrics by Penny Askey. The film was rated "G" and thereby deemed suitable for children, and was shot on location by cinematographer Henning Schellerup, edited by Sharron Miller, and released in the United States in December 1976 with a running time of 112 minutes.

Cast
Denver Pyle as Galen Clark
Ken Berry as Zachary Moore
John Dehner as John Muir
Cheryl Miller as Kathleen Clark
Ford Rainey as Abraham Lincoln
Norman Fell as Doctor
Cliff Osmond as McCollough
Jack Kruschen as Madden
Don Shanks as Teneiya
Melissa Jones as Heather
Brett Palmer as Joey
Prestiss Rowe as Forbes
Hyde Clayton as Chairman of Legislature
Coleman Creel as Senator John Conness
Michael G. Kavanagh as General Carson
Tom Carlin as Harold Lawson
Earl Benton as President's secretary
Michael Ruud as Officer
Lynn Lehman as State Representative

See also
Galen Clark
John Muir
John Conness
Mariposa Grove
Giant sequoias
Yosemite National Park
National Park Service

Bibliography
 
 
 
 
  Originally published as "A Plea for Yosemite" in Yosemite Nature Notes (February 1927), from a manuscript written c. 1907.

References

External links

Yosemite Tales: Galen Clark - Guardian of Yosemite

1976 films
1976 action films
1976 drama films
1976 independent films
1976 Western (genre) films
1970s English-language films
American drama films
American historical comedy-drama films
American historical drama films
Native American drama films
1970s American films